Jacques "Jacky" Rémond (born 23 January 1948) is a French former professional footballer who played as a forward.

Career 
Jacques Rémond, who sometimes goes by the nickname of Jacky, began his professional career at Monaco in 1967. He stayed there two seasons before joining another club in the south of France, Cannes. 

In 1970, when Paris Saint-Germain was being created, Rémond joined the club. He became the first goal-scorer in the Coupe de France in PSG's history, and helped them lift the Division 2 title in 1971. He finished as top-scorer in Paris Saint-Germain's first ever season. Rémond would leave the club in 1972, having scored 15 goals in 41 appearances. He ended his career at Avignon in 1973.

Career statistics

Honours 
Paris Saint-Germain
 Division 2: 1970–71

References

External links 
 

1948 births
Living people
Footballers from Nice
French footballers
Association football forwards
AS Monaco FC players
AS Cannes players
Paris Saint-Germain F.C. players
AC Avignonnais players
Ligue 1 players
Ligue 2 players
French expatriate footballers
Expatriate footballers in Monaco
French expatriate sportspeople in Monaco